Al Tayeb Abdul Rahim (1944 – 18 March 2020) was a Palestinian politician, former Secretary-General of the Palestinian Presidency and a former member of the Central Committee of the Fatah movement. Also he was one of the founders of the Palestinian National Authority (PNA).

Early life and education 
In 1944, Tayeb Abdel Rahim Mahmoud Abdel Halim was born in Anabta town, east of Tulkarm city, to a Palestinian family. His father, the Palestinian poet Abdel Rahim Mahmoud. He had joined Al-Azhar University in 1962, and obtained a Bachelor's degree in Commerce.

Positions 
Abdel-Raheem has been a member of the Palestinian National Council since 1977, a member of the Revolutionary Council of Fatah since 1980 and also a member of the Central Committee of the Fatah movement since 1988. He was ambassador of the Palestine Liberation Organization to China, Egypt, Yugoslavia, and Jordan. He participated in the Oslo Accords and is considered one of the founders of the Palestinian National Authority. He returned with the Palestinian President Yasser Arafat to the Palestinian territories, was entrusted with the functions of Secretary-General of the Palestinian Presidency in 1993 and held the position until his death. He became a member of the Palestinian Legislative Council in 1996, after being elected as a candidate for Tulkarm Governorate.

Death 
On 18 March 2020, Al Tayeb Abdel Rahim died in Cairo.

References 

1944 births
2020 deaths
People from Anabta
Members of the 1996 Palestinian Legislative Council
Palestinian politicians
Al-Azhar University alumni
Members of the Palestinian Central Council
Ambassadors of the State of Palestine to Jordan
Ambassadors of the State of Palestine to Egypt
Ambassadors of the State of Palestine to China
Palestinian expatriates in Yugoslavia
Central Committee of Fatah members